Igbo culture are the customs, practices and traditions of the Igbo people of southeastern Nigeria. It consists of ancient practices as well as new concepts added into the Igbo culture either by cultural evolution or by outside influence. These customs and traditions include the Igbo people's visual art, music and dance forms, as well as their attire, cuisine and language dialects. Because of their various subgroups, the variety of their culture is heightened further.

Music 

The Igbo people have a melodic and symphonic musical style, which they designed from forged iron. Other instruments include opi otherwise known as Oja a wind instrument similar to the flute, igba, and ichaka.

Another popular musical form among Igbo people is highlife, which is a fusion of jazz and traditional music and widely popular in West Africa. The modern Igbo highlife is seen in the works of Prince Nico Mbarga, Dr Sir Warrior, Oliver De Coque, Bright Chimezie, Celestine Ukwu and Chief Osita Osadebe, who are some of the greatest Igbo highlife musicians of the twentieth century.
There are also other notable Igbo highlife artists, like the Mike Ejeagha, Paulson Kalu, Ali Chukwuma, Ozoemena Nwa Nsugbe.

Art 

Igbo Art is known for various types of masquerade, masks and outfits symbolizing people, animals or abstract conceptions. Igbo art is also known for its bronze castings found in the town of Igbo Ukwu from the 9th century. 
Igbo art is any body of visual art that originates from Igbo people.
Igbo culture is a visual art and culture.

Mythology 

While today many Igbo people are Christian, the traditional ancient Igbo religion is known as Odinani. In the Igbo mythology, which is part of their ancient religion, the supreme God is called Chineke ("the God of creation"); Chineke created the world and everything in it and is associated with all things on Earth. To the ancient Igbo, the cosmos is divided into four complex parts:
 
 Okike (Creation)
 Alusi (Supernatural Forces or Deities)
 Mmuo (Spirit)
 Uwa (World)

Alusi 

Alusi, also known as Arusi or Arushi, are minor deities that are worshiped and served in Igbo mythology. There are a list of many different Alusi that exists within each community and each has its own purpose. When there is no longer need for the deity, it is returned to its source, through the help of a Chief Priest or Dibia, who is aware of the procedure and ensures that its done properly.

Mmuo 

Mmuo simply means spirit. It is either a good and godly spirit (mmuo oma) or it is an evil spirit (mmuo ojo). For example, the Ogbanje spirit is seen as an evil spirit (mmuo ojo) and anyone possessed by this spirit is given spiritual attention. (Spiritual attention means a way of casting out the evil spirit through deliverance (Christian way) or through African Traditional Religion  (i.e. digging out his/her “iyi uwa”. the ATR way)). Ogbanje is an Igbo (Nigeria) term that means a repeater or someone who comes and departs.  Ogbanje is not a bad spirit in Igbo Cosmology. It is a word widely used to describe a kid or teenager who is claimed to die and be born repeatedly by the same person.

Yam 
The yam is very important to the Igbo as it is their staple crop. There are celebrations such as the New yam festival which are held for the harvesting of the yam.

The New Yam festival is celebrated annually to secure a good harvest of the staple crop.  The festival is practiced primarily in Nigeria and other countries in West Africa.

Traditional marriage 

The traditional marriage is known as Igbankwu, or wine carrying, since it involves the bride serving up a cup of palm wine to her fiancé. Prior to the wedding, the groom must go to the bride's compound with his father before the Igbankwu day to get the bride's father's consent to marry her daughter. If the bride's father is late, in this case, the bride's brother, uncle or male relative fills in for the bride's late father, as applies to the groom. On the second visit, when kola nuts (oji Igbo) are offered, the two fathers must arrange a symbolic price for the bride. Typically, it takes more than one evening to finalize the bride's price. The fathers bargain about the bride's price. In most cases, the bride's price is just symbolic, in addition to other requirements like kola nuts, goats, wine, fowl and so on. Normally, it takes more than one evening until the ultimate bride's price is agreed upon, after which a magnificent feast is served to both parents. When the supposed bride prize is paid, another evening is set aside for the ceremony. in some cases, it takes about three to four visits before the bride price is finally settled.

During the ceremony, the bride's father fills a cup with palm wine, hands it over to the daughter  and she is to go in search of the groom in the midst of the crowd with the wine, being distracted by the people she will have to find him so she can offer him the drink then, they will both dance to her father. On getting there, they both kneel before him and he will give them his blessings.

After that, they both come out and dance for a while before taking their seats, then refreshment takes place followed by presentation of gifts, then a little or no speech from the MC, closing prayer and departure.

The Igbos are the most numerous inhabitants in Eastern Nigeria. They are hardworking people and are found in Abia, Anambra, Ebonyi, Enugu, Imo, and portions of Delta. They have a highly rich traditional past and have long respected culture and custom in many aspects of their daily existence. When it comes to marriage in Igbo community, there is a process that must be followed before the bride and groom are proclaimed husband and wife in accordance with local law and tradition.

Traditional attire 

Traditionally the attire of the Igbo generally consisted of little clothing as the purpose of clothing then was to conceal private parts, although elders were fully clothed. Children were usually nude from birth till their adolescence (the time when they were considered to have something to hide) but sometimes ornaments such as beads were worn around the waist for medical reasons. Uli body art was also used to decorate both men and women in the form of lines forming patterns and shapes on the body.

With colonialism and the Westernization of Igbo culture, Western styled clothes such as shirts and trousers over took traditional clothing.

Women 
Women carried their babies on their backs with a strip of clothing binding the two with a knot at her chest. This baby carrying technique was and still is practiced by many people groups across Africa, including the Igbo. This method has been modernized in the form of the child carrier. In most cases, Igbo women did not cover their chest areas. Maidens usually wore a short wrapper with beads around their waist with other ornaments such as necklaces and beads. Both men and women wore wrappers.

Men 
Men would wear loin cloths that wrapped around their waist and between their legs to be fastened at their back, the type of clothing appropriate for the intense heat as well as jobs such as farming. Men could also tie a wrapper over their loin cloth. For public occasions such as traditional weddings, men tie such materials like gorge, which is considered to be expensive, and this usually goes with'Isiagu' popular for wealthy and traditional title holders.

Modern traditional attire 

Modern Igbo traditional attire is generally made up, for men, of the Isiagu top which resembles the African Dashiki. Isiagu (or Ishi agu) is usually patterned with lions heads embroidered over the clothing, It can also be plain, (usually black). It is worn with trousers and can be worn with either a traditional title holders hat (a fez named okpu agu or agwu), or with the traditional Igbo stripped men's hat (which resembles the Bobble hat). For women, an embodied puffed sleeve blouse (influenced by European attire) along with two wrappers (usually modern Hollandis material) and a head scarf are worn.

Chieftaincy Title

Highly accomplished men and women are admitted into their noble orders for people of title such as Ndi Ozo or Ndi Nze. These people receive insignia to show their stature. Membership is highly exclusive, and to qualify an individual need to be highly regarded and well-spoken of in the community.

Apprenticeship 

The Igbo have a unique form of apprenticeship in which either a male family member or a community member will spend time (usually in their teens to their adulthood) with another family, when they work for them. After the time spent with the family, the head of the host household, who is usually the older man who brought the apprentice into his household, will establish the apprentice by either setting up a business for him or giving money or tools by which to make a living.

This practice was exploited by Europeans, who used this practice as a way of trading in enslaved people. Olaudah Equiano, although stolen from his home, was an Igbo person who was forced into service to an African family.  He said that he felt part of the family, unlike later, when he was shipped to North America and enslaved in the Thirteen Colonies.

The Igbo apprenticeship system is called Imu Ahia or Igba Boy in Igboland which became more prominent in among the Igbos After the Nigerian civil war. In a quest to survive the £20 policy which was proposed by Obafemi Awolowo that only £20 be given to every Biafran citizen to survive on regardless of what they had in the bank before the war and the rest of the money were held by the Nigerian government.

Petty trade was one of the only ways to build back destroyed communities as well as Farming, but then, farming required time that was not readily available at that moment.

Basically, most people went into trading.

This Imu-Ahia/Igba Boy model was simple, it works in such a way that business owners would take in younger boys which can be relative, sibling or non-relative from same region, house them and have them work as apprentices in business while learning how it works and the secrets of the business. After the allotted time for the training was reached, 5–8 years’ time, a little graduation ceremony would be held for the Nwa Boy (the person that learnt the trade). He would also be paid a lump sum for their services over the years, and the money will be used to start a business for the Nwa Boy.

Osu caste system 

Osu are a group of people whose ancestors were dedicated to serving in shrines and temples for the deities of the Igbo, and therefore were deemed property of the gods. Relationships and sometimes interactions with Osu were (and to this day, still are) in many cases, forbidden.

The Osu system can be traced far back to the days of Igbo forefathers when traditional religion was widely common and popular before christianity penetrated the Igbo land, as we had majorly two categories of people; the freeborn, known in Igbo language as Nwadiala and the slaves, known in Igbo as the Osu.

To this day being called an Osu remains a stigma that prevents people's progress and lifestyles.

Calendar (Iguafo Igbo) 

In the traditional Igbo calendar, a week has 4 days (Eke, Orie, Afọ, Nkwọ), seven weeks make one month, a month has 28 days and there are 13 months in a year. In the last month, an extra day is added. The names of the days have their roots in the mythology of the Kingdom of Nri. It was believed that Eri, the sky-born founder of the Nri kingdom, had gone on a journey to discover the mystery of time. On his journey he had saluted and counted the four days by the names of the spirits that governed them, and so the names of the spirits (eke, orie, afọ and Nkwo) became the days of the week.

An example of a month: Ọnwa Mbụ

Naming after market days 
Newborn babies were sometimes named after the day of the week when born. This is no longer the fashion.  Names such as Mgbeke (maiden [born] on the day of Eke), Mgborie (maiden [born] on the Orie day) are commonly seen among the Igbo people. For males, Mgbe is replaced by Nwa or "Okoro" (Igbo: Child [of]). Examples of this are Solomon Okoronkwo and Nwankwo Kanu, two popular footballers.

Igbo masks and masquerades 

There are two basic types of masquerades, visible and invisible. The visible masquerades are meant for the public. They often are more entertaining. Masks used offer a visual appeal for their shapes and forms. In these visible masquerades, performances of harassment, music, dance, and parodies are acted out (Oyeneke 25).

The invisible masquerades take place at night.  Sound is the main tool for them. The masquerader uses his voice to scream so it may be heard throughout the village. The masks used are usually fierce looking and their interpretation is only fully understood by the society's members.  These invisible masquerades call upon a silent village to strike fear in the hearts of those not initiated into their society.

Kola nut (Ọjị) 
Kola nut occupies a unique position in the cultural life of Igbo people. Ọjị is the first thing served to any visitor in an Igbo home. Ọjị is served before an important function begins, be it marriage ceremony, settlement of family disputes or entering into any type of agreement. Ọjị is traditionally broken into pieces by hand, and if the Kola nut breaks into 3 pieces a special celebration is arranged.

External links

Igboland's Culture and Language, Igboguide.org

References 

 
Nigerian culture
African culture by ethnic group